Harriet Lundgren (1907, Chicago - 1996) was prima ballerina for the Chicago Civic Opera Company from 1922 until 1932. She was also a ballet teacher. 

As a teenager, she trained with several prominent ballet companies, including the Hazel Wallack Studio, the Pavley-Oukrainsky Ballet, and the Adolph Bolm Company. In 1925, she was in the production of The Legend of the Nile.

While dancing with the Civic Opera, she also toured extensively in Europe. She toured in production called A Bird Fantasy in 1926, including at the Palace Theatre in Dallas, Texas and in Kansas City's Newman Theater. She made an appearance as a bird of paradise in the final number of the silent film A Social Celebrity (1926) with Vivian Gonchar, with whom she had toured.

In 1936, she was announced as the principal dancer with the new Coe Glade touring company. Lundgren was one of the principal dancers in the Outdoor Opera of Soldier Field productions of Aida and Il Trovatore in Chicago in 1936. 

After her tenure at the opera, Lundgren taught Russian and Italian ballet at the Bush Conservatory, eventually opening her own school in the Edgewater Beach Apartments, which remained open until the 1960s. She died in 1996.

Personal life 
In 1928, it was announced that she was engaged to Chase Boromeo, who was also employed by the Chicago Civic Opera.

References

External links
 Harriet Lundgren Papers at Newberry Library

People from Chicago
1907 births
1996 deaths
American ballerinas
20th-century American women
20th-century American ballet dancers